"Paper tiger" is the English translation of a Chinese phrase referring to something that appears threatening but is actually weak.

Paper tiger(s) may also refer to:

Films 

 Paper Tiger (1975 film), an adventure film starring David Niven
 Paper Tiger (2019 film), a comedy special by Bill Burr
 Paper Tiger (2020 film), a drama thriller film by Paul Kowalski
 The Paper Tigers (2020), martial arts comedy-drama film by Bao Tran

Music

Albums 

 Paper Tiger, a 1965 album by Sue Thompson
 Paper Tigers, a 2005 album by the Caesars
 Paper Tigers, a 2006 album by Luomo

Songs 

 "Paper Tiger", a song by Sue Thompson, 1965
 "Paper Tigers", a song by The Chameleons from Script of the Bridge, 1983
 "Paper Tiger", a song by All from Allroy Sez, 1988
 "Paper Tiger", a song by Jaci Velasquez from Jaci Velasquez, 1998
 "Paper Tigers", a song by Tom Cochrane from Ragged Ass Road, 1995
 "Paper Tiger", a song by Spoon from Kill the Moonlight, 2002
 "Paper Tiger", a song by Beck from Sea Change, 2002
 "Paper Tiger", a song by Sick of It All from Life on the Ropes, 2003
 "Paper Tigers", a song by Thrice from The Artist in the Ambulance, 2003
 "Paper Tiger", a song by Dry Kill Logic from The Dead and Dreaming, 2004
 "Paper Tigers", a song by Owl City, 2012

Organizations 

 Paper Tiger Books, an imprint of Anova Books of London
 Paper Tiger Television, a non-profit organization based in New York City

Other uses 

 Madiao, a Chinese card game also known as paper tiger
 Paper Tiger (hip hop producer), American musical artist
 Paper Tiger (yacht), a class of catamaran
 Paper Tiger, a book by Tom Coyne